Sir William James Clemens,  (27 March 1873 – 4 September 1941) was a senior Australian public servant, best known for his service to the Commonwealth Public Service Board.

Life and career
Clemens was born at Spring Creek, Beechworth, Victoria on 27 March 1873. His parents were James and Catherine Clemens.

Clemens joined the Victorian Public Service in 1899. In 1901, the year of Federation, Clemens transferred into the Commonwealth Public Service.

In June 1928, Clemens was appointed Secretary of the Department of Home and Territories, and later that year Secretary of the Department of Home Affairs.

In 1929, Clemens was appointed third commissioner of the Public Service Board. In 1931, he was appointed sole Public Service Commissioner after the retirement of W.J. Skewes as Chairman of the Public Service Board.
In 1937, Clemens retired from the public service.

In 1938, the Australian Government appointed Clemens to conduct an inquiry into the high cost of living in Canberra. As part of the inquiry, Clemens was tasked with investigating why the costs of meat, vegetables, milk, groceries and other food in Canberra was much higher than in other nearby cities. While the inquiry was not a Royal Commission, Clemens was still granted the powers to call witnesses, take evidence under oath, and demand the production of books and documents. His report, delivered in March 1939, in six sections, recommended administrative action against monopolies controlling supply in the ACT.

Clemens died in Melbourne on 4 September 1941, following an operation.

Awards and honours
Clemens was appointed a Companion of the Imperial Service Order in June 1925 whilst Secretary of the Public Service Board. In June 1934, he was made a Companion of the Order of St Michael and St George for his services as Commissioner of the Commonwealth Service Board. In 1937 he was made a Knight Bachelor.

In November 2004, a street in Canberra's central business district was named William Clemens Street in Clemens' honour.

References

1873 births
1941 deaths
Australian Companions of the Order of St Michael and St George
Australian Knights Bachelor
Australian public servants
Deaths from cancer in Victoria (Australia)
Australian Companions of the Imperial Service Order
20th-century Australian public servants